The 140th Massachusetts General Court, consisting of the Massachusetts Senate and the Massachusetts House of Representatives, met in 1919.

Senators

Representatives

See also
 1919 Massachusetts gubernatorial election
 66th United States Congress
 List of Massachusetts General Courts

References

Further reading

External links

 
 

Political history of Massachusetts
Massachusetts legislative sessions
massachusetts
1919 in Massachusetts